The  hosts a single piece of artwork and is located on the island of Teshima, Kagawa Prefecture, Japan, in the Seto Inland Sea. It is operated by the Benesse Foundation.  The architect is Ryue Nishizawa (co-founder of SANAA). The museum building is made of a freestanding concrete shell which is 25 cm-thick, 40 by 60 meters, and 4 meters at its highest point.

The artwork is titled Matrix and was created by sculptor Rei Naito.

See also
 Chichu Art Museum
 Inujima Art Project

References

External links
 
 Benesse Art Site Naoshima

Benesse
Museums in Kagawa Prefecture
Contemporary art galleries in Japan
Modernist architecture in Japan
Art museums established in 2010
2010 establishments in Japan
SANAA buildings